Touched by an Angel: The Album is the soundtrack to the TV series Touched by an Angel. It was released on November 3, 1998, by 550 Music. The album peaked at number 1 on the Billboard Top Christian Albums chart, number 3 on the Top Country Albums chart and number 16 on the all-genre Billboard 200. "Somebody's Out There Watching" by The Kinleys was released as a single, reaching number 19 on Hot Country Songs. "Colour Everywhere" by Deana Carter also appeared on her 1999 album Everything's Gonna Be Alright. "Testify to Love" was performed by Wynonna Judd as the character Audrey on the show's 100th episode.

Track listing

Charts

Weekly charts

Year-end charts

References

1998 soundtrack albums
Country albums by American artists
550 Music albums
Television soundtracks